Christ the King College (CKC) is a secondary school founded in 1954 in Bo, Sierra Leone. The school was founded by Mother Marie Louise De Meester in 1954 under the direction of Archbishop Thomas Joseph Brosnahan. The Christ the King College is regarded as one of the most influential schools in West Africa due to its tradition of hardworking teachers and student leadership. Academically, it is considered the leading secondary school in public examinations such as Basic Education Certificate Educations (B.E.C.E) as well as the higher West African Senior Secondary School Examination Council. CKC primarily serves Sierra Leone, but also has international students from Liberia, Gambia, Ghana and Nigeria. Many prominent politicians and business leaders have graduated from CKC.

History
Under the direction of Archbishop Thomas Joseph Brosnahan, Christ the King College was founded and built by Roman Catholic missionaries of the Holy Ghost Order led by Reverend Michael Corbett of Mitchelstown, County Cork, Ireland.

The school itself was founded by Mother Marie Louise De Meester in 1954. When the first students arrived, Archbishop Joseph Ganda, who was a Deacon at the time, was a French teacher at the school.

The original site later became the St Francis Primary School.

Because of the school's reputation, it became the favorite of Sierra Leone's most prominent families and it soon saw the children of paramount chiefs and politicians among its student body earning it the moniker "The Royal College of the South".

Notable alumni
Some notable graduates of CKC include
Solomon Berewa
Bishop Patrick Daniel Koroma<ref
name="BishopsConference"></ref> 
Charles Margai
Kandeh Yumkella

References

External links
 CKC Alumni Association of North America

 
Catholic Church in Sierra Leone
Catholic schools in Sierra Leone
Universities and colleges in Sierra Leone
Bo, Sierra Leone
Southern Province, Sierra Leone